This is a list of cities and towns in Mpumalanga Province, South Africa.

In the case of settlements that have had their official names changed the traditional name is listed first followed by the new name.

A

B

C

D

E

F

G

H

K

L

M

N

O

P

S

T

V

W

Sortable list 

 
Mpumalanga